= Secretary Pete =

Secretary Pete may refer to:

- Pete Buttigieg, U.S. Secretary of Transportation (2021-2025)
- Pete Hegseth, U.S. Secretary of Defense (2025-present)
